Lee Beom-soo (born October 16, 1969) is a South Korean actor. He is well known for his role in Singles, Giant, On Air, Surgeon Bong Dal-hee, as well as in History of a Salaryman.

Lee enrolled in the Department of Theater at Chung-ang University in Seoul in 1988. He made his acting debut in the 1990 film Kurae, Kakkumun Hanulul Boja (Yes, Let’s Look Up At the Sky Now and Again). Following his debut, he appeared in films including The Ginkgo Bed, City of the Rising Sun, The Anarchists, Jungle Juice and Wet Dreams, but it was the 2003 film Singles that made him rise to stardom. The Korean press has dubbed him "The Little Giant of Chungmuro" (Korean equivalent of Hollywood). He received a 2011 Seoul Art & Culture Award for best TV drama actor for his role in Giant.

Personal life
In 2010, he married former news anchor and English interpreter Lee Yoon-jin, who taught him English. Shortly after the May ceremony, they announced that they were expecting their first child. Their daughter, Lee So-eul (이소을), was born on March 1, 2011. On February 21, 2014 their son, Lee Da-eul (이다을) was born.

Filmography

Film

Television series

Web series

Variety show

Music videos

Awards and nominations

Notes

References

External links

 
 
 

 

South Korean male film actors
South Korean male television actors
South Korean male stage actors
Living people
People from Cheongju
1969 births
Chung-Ang University alumni
20th-century South Korean male actors
21st-century South Korean male actors